"Rescue Me" is the debut single by hard rock band Freak of Nature, released in 1993 from their self-titled debut album. The band features former White Lion vocalist Mike Tramp who formed Freak of Nature after White Lion broke up in 1992. Tramp has remarked that the lyrics to this song were autobiographical. A music video was also made for the song.

Track listings
"Rescue Me" (European single)
 "Rescue Me"
 "Are You Ready"
 "Turn the Other Way" (acoustic)
 "What Am I" (acoustic)"

Rescue Me (Japan EP)
 "Rescue Me"
 "What Am I" (acoustic)
 "Turn the Other Way" (acoustic)
 "Wartime"
 "Can't Find My Way"

References

1993 songs
1993 debut singles